Muhammad Hamidullah (19 February 1908 – 17 December 2002) was a scholar of hadiths (muhaddith) and Islamic law (faqih) and a prolific academic author. A polymath with competence in 22 languages, including Urdu (his mother tongue), Persian, Arabic, French, English, German, Italian, Greek, Turkish, and Russian, his dozens of books and hundreds of articles on Islamic science, history and culture appeared in several languages. He was still studying Thai at the age of 84

Early life and background
Hamidullah was from the Deccan area of British India and was born in Hyderabad, capital city of then Hyderabad State, (now Hyderabad, Telangana, India), and hails from a family of scholars, the youngest amongst three brothers and five sisters. His family's roots lie in the Nawayath community, his ancestors were eminent scholars in their own right.

He earned his BA, LLB and MA at Osmania University. He travelled to Germany and was awarded D.Phil. by Bonn University in 1932. After serving in the faculty of Bonn as a lecturer in Arabic and Urdu for a short time, he went to France and registered at Sorbonne University for his second doctorate. He was awarded D.Litt. by the university after 11 months. He taught international law at Osmania University between 1936 and 1946.

His ancestors and extended family were jurists, writers and administrators. His great grandfather Maulvi Mohammed Ghauth Sharfu'l-Mulk (d. 1822) was scholar of Islamic sciences, writing over 30 books in Arabic, Persian and Urdu, including a seven volume exegesis of the Qur'an. His paternal grandfather Qadi Mohammed Sibghatullah was a jurist and a scholar of repute writing an exegesis of the Holy Qu'ran as well as other books. He was also appointed Chief Judge of Madras (now Chennai) in 1855.

Hamidullah's father Mufti Abu Mohammed Khalilullah, was a scholar of Islamic jurisprudence, a director of revenue in the government of Nizam of Hyderabad, and the pioneer in establishing an interest-free banking system in Hyderabad.

Career
In 1948, Hamidullah was appointed by the Nizam as part of the delegation sent to London and the United Nations in New York to seek support against the invasion of the Nizam's territories by Indian Forces. Subsequently, he moved to Pakistan and was involved in writing of Pakistan's constitution after partition of India and Pakistan in 1947.

In 1948, he travelled to France, living there for virtually the remainder of his life, apart from travel to teaching posts he held in Turkey for a number of years. He also held a post with French National Centre for Scientific Research from 1954, which ended in 1978.

In 1985, he was awarded the Hilal-e-Imtiaz, the highest civilian award of Pakistan. The monetary part of the award was donated to the Islamic Research Academy, Islamabad.

Hamidullah was the last remaining citizen of the erstwhile Hyderabad State (which following 1956 reorganisation was divided into 3 on linguistic basis, and absorbed into other states of India, most being in Andhra Pradesh, subsequently Telangana) and never obtained the citizenship of any other nation. Classed as a Refugee of Hyderabad by the French Government, which allowed him to stay in Paris, he remained exiled from his homeland after its annexation by the Indian Government in 1950. Hamidullah devoted his whole life to scholarship and did not marry.

Hamidullah is known for contributions to the research of Hadith history, translations of the Qur'an into multiple languages and in particular into French (first by a Muslim scholar) and for the monumental biography of the Islamic prophet Muhammad in French. He is also famous for discovering a missing work on Muhammad regarded as one of his great contributions to the Hadith literature. The earliest Hadith manuscript still extant today, Sahifa Hammam bin Munabbah, was discovered in a Damascus library. Hammam bin Munabbah being a disciple of Sayyidina Abu Huraira, one of the Sahaba. It proved, that the earliest manuscripts had been absorbed into the much bigger later compilations.

Literary works
Having "authored over one hundred books in English, French, German, Arabic and Urdu, and about 1000 scholarly essays and articles on the various aspects of Islam and related areas", his notable publications include :
 The Muslim Conduct of State: Being a Treatise on Siyar (Siyar), General Introduction (1941, 1953)
 The First Written Constitution in the World (1941, 1975 and 1986)
 Islamic Notion of Conflict of Laws (1945)
 Die Rezeption Europaischen Rechts in Haiderabad (1953)
 Le "Livre des genenalogies" [D'al-Baladuriy by al-Baladuri] (1954)
 Introduction to Islam (from 1957 onwards in numerous languages besides English)
 Le Saint Coran: Traduction et commentaire de Muhammad Hamidullah avec la collaboration de M. Leturmy (from 1959 onwards)
 Muhammad Ibn Ishaq, the Biographer of the Holy Prophet (Pakistan Historical Society) (1967)
 Muhammad Rasulullah: A Concise Survey of the Life and Work of the Founder of Islam (1979)
 Islam: A General Picture (1980)
 Islam, Philosophy and Science: Four Public Lectures Organized By Unesco June 1980 (editor) (1981)
 Why Fast?: Spiritual & Temporal Study of Fast in Islam (Centre Culturel Islamique Paris Series) (1982)
 The Prophet's Establishing a State and his Succession (1988)
 The Prophet of Islam: Prophet of Migration (1989)
 Kurʼân-ı Kerîm tarihi: Bir deneme (Ilmi eserler) (1991)
 Battlefields of the Prophet Muhammad (1992)
 Emergence of Islam (1993)
 Islam in a Nutshell (1996)
 The Life and Work of the Prophet of Islam (1998)

See also 
 Contemporary Islamic philosophy

References

External links 
 hamidullah.info

1908 births
2002 deaths
Indian Sunni Muslim scholars of Islam
International law scholars
Philosophers of law
Recipients of Hilal-i-Imtiaz
University of Bonn alumni
University of Paris alumni
Academic staff of the University of Bonn
Translators of the Quran into French
People from Hyderabad State
Sunni fiqh scholars
Academic staff of Osmania University
Osmania University alumni
20th-century Indian translators
Pakistani emigrants to France
Pakistani people of Hyderabadi descent
Scholars from Hyderabad, India
Jamia Nizamia alumni